Ross Lara is an American music composer, producer, sound designer and engineer from the Breckenridge, CO. As a producer, composer, mix engineer, and sound designer, Ross Lara has created music for high concept projects with Red Bull, Meta Platforms, Epic Games, and dozens of artists that have topped international Billboard charts. His innovative process has led to scoring award-winning films, composing for cutting edge video games, and amassing over 600 million streams and listens. His inspiration comes from his passion for vintage gear, his band The Spacies, snowmobiling, and recording the symphony of nature around us.

Receiving his first piece of music equipment at the age of 12, changed his life forever. Ross started his musical career as a DJ, eventually sharing the some of the worlds largest stages with the likes of Paul Oakenfold, Deadmau5, and Paul Van Dyk. His electronic background led to a blossoming career in pop music for both American and International artist. His extensive catalog includes #1 K-Pop singles and a plethora of music for Universal Music, Walt Disney Records, Warner Brothers and more. His love for technology, vintage gear, and boundary pushing music production led him to creating music and sound for multimedia projects including film and video games. Ross is now focusing on the audio revolution of immersive sound with Dolby Atmos.

Archipelago Entertainment
In 2014 Ross Lara and Brian Shenefelt founded Archipelago Entertainment in Atlanta, GA. The company’s premier immersive production studio is now located in Breckenridge, CO with hubs in Orlando, FL, Los Angeles, CA, and Washington DC. Archipelago Entertainment is a music company focused on bringing the highest quality production, mixing, scoring and sound design with a blend of acoustic instrumentation and cutting-edge technology. The team’s extensive discography of music ranges from video games and film to audio experiences and international pop. Archipelago consistently pushes boundaries of the musical creation process and is leading the way on immersive audio production and mixing.

The Studio
Archipelago’s premier production studio, in Breckenridge, Colorado, is now the highest elevation Dolby Atmos studio at almost 9,000 feet. The serene location offers profound inspiration while the technological advancements have been the backbone for the music creation process from beginning concept to final mix. An extensive array of music has been created over the past decade, coming from the upright piano and an array of synthesizers, ranging from vintage to modern. Gear highlights: Focusrite RedNet Interfaces, Trinnov D-Mon 12, Inward Connection DEQ-1 Mastering Equalizer, Baldwin Upright & Yamaha Baby Grand Pianos, Dynaudio & Output Frontier Speakers, and Sequential, Oberheim, and Korg Synthesizers.

The Spacies
The Spacies is an electronic music duo composed of Dave Cook and Ross Lara. Their 2016 single "Slow Mo" with remixes by Felix Parmqvist, went #1 on Hype Machine and entered Top 50 Spotify Pop charts in Australia and Canada. Dave and Ross co-wrote "Dream Girl" by SHINee that was released February 19, 2013 which was nominated for Song of the Year at the Golden Disk Awards in Seoul, Korea.

Discography

References

Record producers from Virginia
People from Reston, Virginia
Living people
Musicians from Virginia
Year of birth missing (living people)